Jennifer Mary Rankine (born 22 September 1953) is a former Australian politician. She represented the South Australian House of Assembly seat of Wright for the Australian Labor Party from the 1997 election until her retirement in 2018.

Prior to entering parliament, Rankine was an Australian Services Union workplace delegate for staffers of parliamentary offices.

The 2006 election saw Rankine increase her margin to 15.3 points. As of the 2014 election, Rankine holds Wright with a margin of 3.0 points. Rankine has served in a range of ministerial positions. She is from the Labor Left faction.

Rankine's long-term and current de facto partner is fellow state Labor MP Michael Atkinson.

Rankine announced in February 2017 that she would be retiring from parliament as of the 2018 election.

References

External links
 
 Parliamentary Profile: SA Labor website
 

1953 births
Living people
Members of the South Australian House of Assembly
Labor Left politicians
21st-century Australian politicians
21st-century Australian women politicians
Women members of the South Australian House of Assembly